The Battle of Amritsar, also known as the Battle of Gohalwar, was fought between Durrani Empire and Shaheedan Misl of Dal Khalsa on 11 November 1757.

Background
Ahmad Shah Durrani had finished raiding Hindustan and was returning to Afghanistan after sacking Delhi in January 1757, but on the way his army was attacked by Sikh bands under Ala Singh and Baba Deep Singh near Sirhind and Malerkotla.When Ahmad Shah reached Lahore, he sent a military detachment to sack the town of Amritsar,with the Shri Harmandir Sahib destroyed,and the Sikh population being massacred.Ahmad Shah then appointed Timur Shah as the governor of Lahore with Jahan Khan as his deputy in May of 1757 and ordered Timur Shah to chastise the Sikhs. The Afghan government began pursuing the Sikhs and forcing them to seek refuge in Himalayan tracts and the Malwa desert. The news of the desecration of Shri Harmandir Sahib had reached Baba Deep Singh who was stationed at Damdama Sahib.Baba Deep Singh was infuriated to hear the news of the desecration and vowed to liberate Harmandir sahib from the Afghans,and to celebrate the Diwali festival at Amritsar.A large number of Sikhs from the Shaheedan Misl began joining Baba Deep Singh,and Sikhs from various local towns and villages began joining the Sikh force.Baba Deep Singh and the Sikh forces soon reached Taran Taran Sahib,and had mobilized an army Numbering 5,000.

Battle 
Jahan Khan soon received intelligence that the Sikhs had gathered at Amritsar and were creating disturbances, which compelled Jahan Khan to mobilize an Afghan force to fight the Sikhs.Jahan Khan ordered that any man in the city of Lahore who owned a horse and was or wasn't  in service of the government should join his expedition against the Sikhs.Mughlani Begum sent her personal guards to join Jahan Khan.Qasim Khan also joined Jahan Khan in his expedition against the Sikhs.Jahan Khan sent letters to Haji Atai Khan to join his forces and to reach the city of Amritsar.Jahan Khan with an army numbering 2,000 reached the village of Gohalwar.The total number of Afghan soldiers present in the battle was around 20,000.Jahan Khan was surprised to find out that the Afghan forces under Atai Khan hadn't reached the rendezvous point and had delayed his march.The Sikhs then began an attack against the Afghans and fought them in the village of Gohalwar.The Afghan forces under Jahan Khan were greatly overwhelmed by the Sikhs and some of his own soldiers began retreating.Reinforcements soon arrived from Haji Atai Khan later during the battle.It was during the battle that Baba Deep Singh would get into a duel with Jamal Shah, one of the Afghan commanders.It was during this duel that Baba Deep Singh would suffer a mortal wound around the neck,while Jamal Shah himself was killed.Despite the severe injury he sustained, Baba Deep Singh continued to fight until he finally collapsed and fell dead near Amritsar. According to a legend, Baba Deep Singh was fully decapitated and continued to fight against the Afghans while holding his head on one hand and his sword on the other.

Result of the battle
The result of the battle is disputed. According to Professor of Political Science, Tom Lansford, the Sikhs defeated an outnumbered Afghan army. While Tony Jacques, states the Sikhs were outnumbered and chased off the Afghan army, yet Baba Deep Singh was killed by Attal Khan. Historical Researcher Vivek Chadha states that the Sikhs defeated the Afghans at the Battle of Amritsar. 

Historian J.S. Grewal states that Jahan Khan was nearly overwhelmed by the Sikhs before Afghan reinforcements arrived to save him.  Historian Rishi Singh states that Jahan Khan achieved a victory along with the death of Baba Deep Singh.  The historian Himadri Banerjee states the Sikhs were defeated and many were massacred.According to historian Ganda Singh,with the arrival of reinforcments under Haji Atai Khan,the Sikhs suffered defeat and were pursued by the Afghans all the way to the city of Amritsar.When the Afghans entered the city,they got into a clash with 5 Sikh soldiers who were stationed at the main gate.It was in this clash that Mir Nimat Khan,one of the lahore chiefs,was killed.The Afghans then set up camp for the night and returned to Lahore a few days later.

See also
Jaspat Rai 
Nihang 
Battle of Mahilpur 
Maratha conquest of North-west India

Notes

References

Sources

Singh, Bhagat (1993). A History of the Sikh Misals. Publication Bureau Punjabi University Patiala ISBN 978-8130201818
Gupta, Hari (2007). History Of The Sikhs Vol. II Evolution Of Sikh Confederacies (1707-69). Munshiram Manoharlal Publishers Pvt. Ltd. ISBN 81-215-0248-9
Singh, Ganda (1959). Ahmad Shah Durrani, Father of Modern Afghanistan. Asia Publishing house.
Singh, Harbans (1995). The Encyclopedia of Sikhism Vol I A-D (2nd ed.) Patiala:Punjabi Univeristy.  

Conflicts in 1757